is a Ryukyuan gusuku in Ishigaki, Okinawa. It is located on Ishigaki Island next to Miyara Bay. It was listed as one of the Historic Sites of Japan in 1978.

History
Furusutobaru Castle is best known as the residence of Oyake Akahachi. Through charisma, he managed to convince the other chieftains and lords of the Yaeyama Islands to follow him, then declared that Yaeyama would not pay tribute to the Ryukyu Kingdom. He then proposed an invasion of Miyako Island, which, after hearing of these plans, Nakasone Toyomiya of Miyako then led a preemptive invasion of Yaeyama. Miyako's forces landed in Miyara Bay and attacked Furusutobaru Castle in 1500. Nakasone would go on to conquer the rest of Yaeyama and then submitted to King Shō Shin when faced with the Ryukyuan army.

Archaeological finds
The site sits on a ridge overlooking Miyara Bay. There are 15 walled enclosures, a few of which have been excavated. Finds include local pottery, white porcelain and celadon from China, and the bones of horses and cows.

References

Castles in Okinawa Prefecture